Morpho adonis, the Adonis morpho, is a Neotropical butterfly. It is found in Venezuela, Suriname, French Guiana, Colombia, Ecuador, Brazil, and Peru.

Morpho adonis is a species group which includes several species.
 Morpho adonis (Guianas, Cayenne) 
 Morpho eugenia (Guyana) 
 Morpho uraneis (Brazil) 
 Morpho marcus probably conspecific with adonis and the correct name.

Habitat
Morpho adonis is found in mid-elevation rain forest at altitudes between about 300–1000 meters above sea level.

Behaviour
In 1913, Hans Fruhstorfer wrote: "Dr. Hahnel reports its capture at Iquitos and Pebas. There it flies quickly and impetuously (sometimes at an elevation of 12 ft.), dashing out from among the branches, crossing the road and following clearings among the trees, in which they sail along just over the tops or in and out among the branches."

Etymology
The butterfly is named for the mythological Adonis, the Greek god of beauty and desire.

References

Le Moult (E.) & Réal (P.), 1962-1963. Les Morpho d'Amérique du Sud et Centrale, Editions du cabinet entomologique E. Le Moult, Paris.
Paul Smart, 1976 The Illustrated Encyclopedia of the Butterfly World in Color. London, Salamander: Encyclopedie des papillons. Lausanne, Elsevier Sequoia (French language edition)   page 232 as Morpho adonis, ssp.huallaga Michael, female fig.3 (Peru), ssp.huallaga Michael, male underside fig. 5 (Peru), ssp. adonis, male fig 4 (Guyana).

External links

Butterflies of America Morpo marcus Images of type and other specimens
Butterflies of America Morpho eugenia Images of Neotype 
Butterflies of America Morpho uraneis Images of type and other specimens
"Morpho Fabricius, 1807" at Markku Savela's Lepidoptera and Some Other Life Forms
Fiebig Photographs.

Morpho
Lepidoptera of French Guiana
Fauna of Brazil
Nymphalidae of South America
Butterflies described in 1775
Taxa named by Pieter Cramer